The Gambrill Storage Building is a historic two-story building in Rapid City, South Dakota. It was designed in the Renaissance Revival style, and built in 1910 by Horace C. Gambrill. 

It was reported in the Rapid City Journal in 1910 that it was then the only storage building/warehouse in town. Another RCJ article from 1984 noted, "the building retains its original rectangular windows capped with arched lintels and its contrasting colored brick on the front facade."

It has been listed in the National Register of Historic Places since February 23, 1984.

References

National Register of Historic Places in Pennington County, South Dakota
Renaissance Revival architecture in South Dakota
Commercial buildings completed in 1910
1910 establishments in South Dakota